Simon Westaway (born 22 December 1958) is an Australian actor who has appeared in many television series, films and theatre productions. He is most remembered as portraying Sergeant Peter "Noddy" Faithful in the crime drama series Phoenix, and it's legal drama spin-off Janus, as well as portraying Domenic "Mick" Gatto in the crime series Underbelly and its sequel in 2014, Fat Tony & Co. He currently hosts Seven Network reality series Surf Patrol. He has three children: Jackson, Bella and Ruben. He and his wife divorced in 2009. 

Westaway is also the voiceover behind the popular Foster's beer commercials in the US. "Foster's. Australian for beer."

Television
 Phoenix as Peter Faithful
 Janus as Peter Faithful
 Underbelly as Domenic "Mick" Gatto
 BeastMaster as Baha
 Family and Friends as Damien Chandler
 Surf Patrol as himself (voiceover)
Neighbours as Kevin Harvey
Halifax f.p. as Jon Knight
 Pugwall as Policeman #1
 Celebrity MasterChef as himself
 Fat Tony & Co. as Domenic "Mick" Gatto
 Squirrel Boys - The Coach

Films
 Australian Rules
 Tempe Tip
 Slate, Wyn & Me
 Babe: Pig in the City
 The Thin Red Line
 Feathers
 The Great Raid
 Sahara

Stage
 The Man from Snowy River: Arena Spectacular as Dan Mulligaan

Rocky Horror Show New Zealand 1988 as FranknFurter

External links 
 
 Simon Westaway photo and information — "Phoenix" cast

Australian male television actors
Australian male voice actors
1958 births
Living people